TGM Medan or Thamrin Graha Metropolitan Medan is an  Indonesian football club based in Medan, North Sumatra. They currently compete in the Liga 3. 

TGM Medan stadium named Teladan Stadium. Its location is in downtown Medan

Achievement
Liga Indonesia Third Division
Runner-up: 2010–11

References

External links
 Website of the PSSI's Board for Amateur Leagues

Football clubs in Indonesia
Football clubs in North Sumatra
Association football clubs established in 2002
2002 establishments in Indonesia